Moscow City Duma District 10 is one of 45 constituencies in Moscow City Duma. The constituency has covered parts of North-Eastern Moscow since 2014. From 1993-2005 District 10 also was based in North-Eastern Moscow, but covered more areas to the south of its current configuration; from 2005-2014 the constituency was based in Southern Moscow (it actually overlapped the entirety of State Duma Orekhovo-Borisovo constituency in 2005-2009).

Members elected

Election results

2001

|-
! colspan=2 style="background-color:#E9E9E9;text-align:left;vertical-align:top;" |Candidate
! style="background-color:#E9E9E9;text-align:left;vertical-align:top;" |Party
! style="background-color:#E9E9E9;text-align:right;" |Votes
! style="background-color:#E9E9E9;text-align:right;" |%
|-
|style="background-color:#1042A5"|
|align=left|Ivan Novitsky (incumbent)
|align=left|Union of Right Forces
|
|44.44%
|-
|style="background-color:"|
|align=left|Valery Shaposhnikov
|align=left|Independent
|
|22.91%
|-
|style="background-color:"|
|align=left|Georgy Sitnikov
|align=left|Communist Party
|
|19.32%
|-
|style="background-color:#000000"|
|colspan=2 |against all
|
|10.17%
|-
| colspan="5" style="background-color:#E9E9E9;"|
|- style="font-weight:bold"
| colspan="3" style="text-align:left;" | Total
| 
| 100%
|-
| colspan="5" style="background-color:#E9E9E9;"|
|- style="font-weight:bold"
| colspan="4" |Source:
|
|}

2005

|-
! colspan=2 style="background-color:#E9E9E9;text-align:left;vertical-align:top;" |Candidate
! style="background-color:#E9E9E9;text-align:left;vertical-align:top;" |Party
! style="background-color:#E9E9E9;text-align:right;" |Votes
! style="background-color:#E9E9E9;text-align:right;" |%
|-
|style="background-color:"|
|align=left|Stepan Orlov (incumbent)
|align=left|United Russia
|
|49.28%
|-
|style="background-color:"|
|align=left|Yevgeny Balashov (incumbent)
|align=left|Rodina
|
|19.38%
|-
|style="background-color:"|
|align=left|Vladimir Mashkin
|align=left|Communist Party
|
|8.43%
|-
|style="background-color:#DD137B"|
|align=left|Larisa Gorchakova
|align=left|Social Democratic Party
|
|8.36%
|-
|style="background-color:"|
|align=left|Viktor Osipovich
|align=left|Liberal Democratic Party
|
|4.91%
|-
|style="background-color:"|
|align=left|Yevgeny Ageyev
|align=left|Independent
|
|4.22%
|-
| colspan="5" style="background-color:#E9E9E9;"|
|- style="font-weight:bold"
| colspan="3" style="text-align:left;" | Total
| 
| 100%
|-
| colspan="5" style="background-color:#E9E9E9;"|
|- style="font-weight:bold"
| colspan="4" |Source:
|
|}

2009

|-
! colspan=2 style="background-color:#E9E9E9;text-align:left;vertical-align:top;" |Candidate
! style="background-color:#E9E9E9;text-align:left;vertical-align:top;" |Party
! style="background-color:#E9E9E9;text-align:right;" |Votes
! style="background-color:#E9E9E9;text-align:right;" |%
|-
|style="background-color:"|
|align=left|Mikhail Antontsev (incumbent)
|align=left|United Russia
|
|68.44%
|-
|style="background-color:"|
|align=left|Anatoly Zhigalov
|align=left|Communist Party
|
|11.76%
|-
|style="background-color:"|
|align=left|Vladimir Grankin
|align=left|A Just Russia
|
|7.97%
|-
|style="background-color:"|
|align=left|Oleg Guryev
|align=left|Liberal Democratic Party
|
|4.80%
|-
|style="background-color:"|
|align=left|Aleksey Shishov
|align=left|Independent
|
|3.71%
|-
| colspan="5" style="background-color:#E9E9E9;"|
|- style="font-weight:bold"
| colspan="3" style="text-align:left;" | Total
| 
| 100%
|-
| colspan="5" style="background-color:#E9E9E9;"|
|- style="font-weight:bold"
| colspan="4" |Source:
|
|}

2014

|-
! colspan=2 style="background-color:#E9E9E9;text-align:left;vertical-align:top;" |Candidate
! style="background-color:#E9E9E9;text-align:left;vertical-align:top;" |Party
! style="background-color:#E9E9E9;text-align:right;" |Votes
! style="background-color:#E9E9E9;text-align:right;" |%
|-
|style="background-color:"|
|align=left|Larisa Kartavtseva
|align=left|Independent
|
|52.96%
|-
|style="background-color:"|
|align=left|Maksim Fadeyev
|align=left|Communist Party
|
|11.86%
|-
|style="background-color:"|
|align=left|Dmitry Kuznetsov
|align=left|Liberal Democratic Party
|
|10.61%
|-
|style="background-color:"|
|align=left|Aleksandr Sablukov
|align=left|A Just Russia
|
|10.08%
|-
|style="background-color:"|
|align=left|Inna Mertsalova
|align=left|Yabloko
|
|7.38%
|-
|style="background-color:"|
|align=left|Aleksey Kravtsov
|align=left|Independent
|
|3.53%
|-
| colspan="5" style="background-color:#E9E9E9;"|
|- style="font-weight:bold"
| colspan="3" style="text-align:left;" | Total
| 
| 100%
|-
| colspan="5" style="background-color:#E9E9E9;"|
|- style="font-weight:bold"
| colspan="4" |Source:
|
|}

2019

|-
! colspan=2 style="background-color:#E9E9E9;text-align:left;vertical-align:top;" |Candidate
! style="background-color:#E9E9E9;text-align:left;vertical-align:top;" |Party
! style="background-color:#E9E9E9;text-align:right;" |Votes
! style="background-color:#E9E9E9;text-align:right;" |%
|-
|style="background-color:"|
|align=left|Larisa Kartavtseva (incumbent)
|align=left|Independent
|
|49.95%
|-
|style="background-color:"|
|align=left|Yury Dashkov
|align=left|Communist Party
|
|28.50%
|-
|style="background-color:"|
|align=left|Andrey Suvorov
|align=left|A Just Russia
|
|10.29%
|-
|style="background-color:"|
|align=left|Aleksey Kryukov
|align=left|Liberal Democratic Party
|
|9.94%
|-
|style="background-color:"|
|align=left|Igor Dashkevich
|align=left|Communists of Russia
|
|6.87%
|-
| colspan="5" style="background-color:#E9E9E9;"|
|- style="font-weight:bold"
| colspan="3" style="text-align:left;" | Total
| 
| 100%
|-
| colspan="5" style="background-color:#E9E9E9;"|
|- style="font-weight:bold"
| colspan="4" |Source:
|
|}

Notes

References

Moscow City Duma districts